Brisbane Knights Football Club is an Australian soccer club from Rocklea, a suburb of Brisbane, Queensland, Australia. The club currently plays in the Brisbane Premier League, the first tier of senior football in Brisbane (third tier in Queensland and fourth overall in Australia).

History 
The club was initially formed in 1952 under the name HNK Croatia Brisbane but struggled to sustain a full squad of players for the entire season, so the club disbanded. With the steady growth of the Croatian community in following years, the club was reformed in 1957. On 15 May 1957 the club was registered with the governing federation as an official soccer club.

The club also played under the names New Farm SC (from 1971-1974), Sunnyside United SC (1975-1987), Croatia Soccer Club (1988), Brisbane Croatia Soccer Club and Rocklea United SC. In the early years the club played at council grounds throughout Brisbane until 1970, when the local Croatian community purchased 50-odd acres of land at Rocklea, an inner city south-west suburb of Brisbane. In the 1980s the club competed in the Brisbane Premier League.

Recent History 
After relegation from the Capital League 1 in 2013, the Knights managed immediate promotion in 2014, finishing runners up in the Capital League 2. In 2015, Knights finished fifth in League 1. Brisbane Knights hosted the 41st annual Australian-Croatian Soccer Tournament in October 2015. It was the fourth time the Queensland club hosted the tournament, having previously hosted in 1982 (winning the tournament for the first and only time to date), 1989 and 2001. Melbourne Knights FC took out their sixth title at the tournament.

After another mid-table finish in 2016, Knights finished in third place in League 1 in 2017 and were promoted back to the Brisbane Premier League due to a league re-structure, where Football Queensland Premier League became the new state-wide second tier and the BPL became the third state tier. The Knights finished in the lower half of the BPL table in both 2018 and 2019.

In January 2020, it was announced that Gold Coast Knights SC had assumed control of Brisbane Knights Football Club.

The COVID-19 pandemic saw the Brisbane Knights field one Men's Brisbane Premier League squad. All matches were played as away fixtures whilst extensive repairs were conducted to the fields of the Brisbane Knights by the Gold Coast Knights Football Club. 

In 2021, the Brisbane Knights re-assumed control with the guidance from the Gold Coast Knights Football Club with teams in the Men's Brisbane Premier League, Masters Competition and Women's Brisbane City League.

Their home continues to be the Croatian Club Brisbane in Rocklea and in February 2021, the main playing field was re-named the Ivan "Johnny" Mesic Memorial Field, named in honour of one the founders of the Club.

Honours
Australian-Croatian Soccer Tournament Champions 1982
Ampol Cup Runner Up 1985
Division 1 Champions 1999
Division 1 Runner Up 1998

Notable players 

 Dario Vidošić

See also
List of Croatian football clubs in Australia
Australian-Croatian Soccer Tournament

References

External links
Rocklea United Official Website

Soccer clubs in Brisbane
Brisbane Premier League teams
Croatian sports clubs in Australia
Association football clubs established in 1952